Charles Messina (born October 21, 1971 in Greenwich Village, New York) is an American playwright, screenwriter, director, and co-founder of NahNotOutsideMyHouse! Productions. He is of Italian-American descent. He attended Xavier High School and then later, New York University.

Career 

Messina's most notable stage work is the Off-Broadway play Mercury: The Afterlife and Times of a Rock God, a monodrama written and directed by Messina about Queen frontman Freddie Mercury, which starred Khalid Gonçalves and later, Amir Darvish.

Among Messina's other biographical works, there is Cirque Jacqueline, about the life of Jacqueline Kennedy Onassis, which was written by and starred Andrea Reese, and The Accidental Pervert, an autobiographical one man show written and performed by Andrew Goffman and directed by Messina.

In 1999, Actor Found Dead, a one-act play written and directed by Messina about actor James Hayden (who Messina, as a child, had seen in American Buffalo), debuted at the John Houseman Studio Theatre in New York City. The play starred Khalid Gonçalves as Hayden, with Andrew I. Mones and David B. Martin.  A screenplay based on Hayden's life was optioned in late 2007.

In the fall of 2006, the Messina-penned film They're Just My Friends was released, starring Lord Jamar, Malik Yoba, and Bruce Altman.

In August 2007, Messina directed Two-Mur Humor, which was an official entry in the 2007 Fringe Festival in NYC.

In 2007, Messina also directed the big budget musical Be My Love: The Mario Lanza Story, written by Richard Vetere, about the life of singer Mario Lanza, which was produced by Sonny Grosso and Phil Ramone.  It premiered at The Tilles Center for the Performing Arts in Greenvale, NY.

Also in 2007, Messina's play Merging starring Jason Cerbone, and Ernest Mingione won Best Play in The Players' Theater's Shortened Attention Span Theater Festival in Greenwich Village.  A film version of the play Merging was released in 2009.

Messina has directed the off-Broadway shows Rockaway Boulevard by Richard Vetere, The Accidental Pervert by Andrew Goffman, and Art Metrano's Accidental Comedy, as well as a staged reading of his own script Younger, starring Joe Piscopo.

Messina's play, Homeland, which premiered in 2008, starred Sopranos actors Dan Grimaldi, Jason Cerbone, Joe Lisi, as well as Amir Darvish.

Messina co-wrote the book My Father, My Don, about the life of Genovese Capo James "Jimmy Nap" Napoli and his son Tony Napoli, in collaboration with Tony Napoli.

In May 2010, Messina directed and co-wrote (along with Vincent Gogliormella) the script Twas The Night Before a Brooklyn Christmas, starring Mario Cantone, Michael Rispoli and Robert Cuccioli, also at 45 Bleecker Street.

In 2011, the film Spy was released, starring Vincent Pastore, Frank Vincent, and Ben Curtis.  Messina was co-author of the film's screenplay.

On March 29, 2012 - April 1, 2012, three of Messina's plays - Merging, Fugazy, and Sick Bastids - under the title The Tenement Plays, were performed at the 13th St Repertory Theater.

Twilight Theatre Productions performed three of Messina's plays - Thompson Street, Lilac, and Fugazy - from June 21 through August 2, 2013 at Kenlake State Resort Park in Hardin, KY.

On September 22, 2013, The Abingdon Theatre hosted a special reading of three of Messina's plays: Fairies, Thompson Street, and Sinkhole, as part of a fundraiser for the theater.  The cast included (in alphabetical order): Michael Barbieri, Anthony DeSando, Alfredo Diaz, Nick Fondulis, Khalid Gonçalves, Steven LaChioma, Tom Alan Robbins, Scott Seidman, and Johnny Tammaro.

According to BroadwayWorld.com, Fairies was "so beloved by audiences" that The Abingdon Theatre decided to produce the show again, on December 17, 2013.  The entire original cast returned.

On November 16, 2014, three new one-act plays by Messina were read at The Abingdon Theatre as part of their weekly Sunday Series.  The plays, titled A Mooney for the Misbegotten, Fifteen Minutes of Shame, and Chubby & Glen, featured actors Jason Cerbone, Anthony DeSando, Mary Dimino, Nick Fondulis, Valerie Smaldone, Johnny Tammaro, and Michael Townsend Wright.

The Abingdon Theatre once again hosted a reading of Messina's one-act trilogies, this time on March 22, 2015.  Titled Three from the Neighborhood, the evening marked the debut of Dewey, Phukum & Howe, The Neighborhood, and The Wreck.  The cast featured: Michael Barbieri, Rosie DeSanctis, Anthony DeSando, Alfredo Diaz, Mary Dimino, Nick Fondulis, Lynne Koplitz, Khalid Gonçalves, Ernest Mingione, Kyle C. Mumford, Craig Rivela, Jonathan Smith, Johnny Tammaro and Michael Townsend Wright.

The Abingdon Theatre Company presented a reading of Messina's play A ROOM OF MY OWN, starring Mario Cantone, Ralph Macchio, Joli Tribuzio, Tammaro, Barbieri, Jain, Antoinette LaVecchia and Michael Townsend Wright on April 21, 2015. [17]The comedy is based on Messina's life growing up in Greenwich Village in the late 1970s.

The Abingdon Theatre has committed to a full production of the play next season in Spring 2016. The autobiographical play is a bawdy, family comedy revolving around a writer telling the story of his life, as events and characters start to slowly slip away from his control.

Messina will be debuting True East, an urban Twilight Zone-esque podcast series set in the Greenwich Village of the 1980s.  The series is being produced by Hollywood veteran Craig Singer in conjunction with Sound Lounge's Marshall Grupp.  It will be narrated by actor Ralph Macchio.

Upcoming and announced projects

A Room of My Own 

On September 20, 2010, a staged reading of Messina's semi-autobiographical play A Room of My Own, about an Italian-American family living in Greenwich Village in the late 1970s, was performed at The Theatre at 45 Bleecker Street in Greenwich Village with Ralph Macchio, Cantone, Lynne Koplitz, Johnny Tammaro, John Barbieri, and Kendra Jain.

On November 13, 2012, a second reading of the play was done at 45 Bleecker Street, starring Cantone, Rachel Dratch, Zach Galligan, and Mike Barbieri, as well as Tammaro, and Jain.

The Abingdon Theatre Company presented a reading of Charles Messina's play A Room of My Own, starring Cantone, Macchio, Joli Tribuzio, Tammaro, Barbieri, Jain, Antoinette LaVecchia and Michael Townsend Wright on April 21, 2015. The comedy is based on Messina's life growing up in Greenwich Village in the late 1970s.

Broadway World announced that the Abingdon Theatre will be debuting the first full production of A Room of My Own.  The show will have a special limited-engagement run from February 19 - March 20, 2016. The autobiographical play is a bawdy, family comedy revolving around a writer telling the story of his life, as events and characters start to slowly slip away from his control.

A Room of My Own starring Ralph Macchio and Mario Cantone will open on February 13, 2016 at the Abingdon Theatre.

The Wanderer 

Messina is currently collaborating with Dion DiMucci on a musical about the singer's life called The Wanderer - the Life and Music of Dion, with Ted Kurdyla as executive producer. The first reading of the play was performed at the Triad Theater in New York City on October 13, 2011. On September 13 and 14, 2018 the NYC workshop of “The Wanderer” took place at the Baryshnikov Arts Center.  It was produced by Jill Menza and Charles Messina, written by Charles Messina and directed by Kenneth Ferrone.  It starred Mike Wartella, Christy Altomare, Joey McIntyre, Johnny Tammaro, Joli Tribuzio, Lance Roberts and others.

In a December 9, 2011 interview with The New York Times, Messina explained why he chose Dion's story as a subject: "The conflict was irresistible to me as a dramatist," he said. "But what's interesting about Dion is that he lived. In my other plays, you don't have that ending where the guy overcame. Dion overcame."

On March 18, 2019, BroadwayWorld announced that The Wanderer would begin a run at New Jersey's Paper Mill Playhouse in the Spring of 2020, before its eventual Broadway debut. Kenneth Ferrone is slated to direct.

Summary of Works

Plays 

 Roman Candles (1995) - writer, director
 Mercury: The Afterlife and Times of a Rock God (1997) - writer, director
 Actor Found Dead (1999) - writer, director
 Rockaway Boulevard (2004) - director
 Cirque Jacqueline (2004–2008) - director
 The Accidental Pervert (2005–present) - director
 Younger  (2006) - writer, director
 Two-Mur Humor (2007) - writer, director
 Be My Love: The Mario Lanza Story (2007) - director
 Accidental Comedy (2009) - director
 A Room of My Own (2009) - writer, director
 The Fatman Cometh (2011) - director
 Sick Bastids (2012) - writer
 Thompson Street (2013) - writer
 Lilac (2013) - writer
 Fugazy (2013) - writer
 An Honest Woman  (2013) - writer, director
 Fairies (2013) - writer, director
 Thompson Street (2013) - writer, director
 Sinkhole (2013) - writer, director
 Chubby & Glen (2014) - writer, director
 Fifteen Minutes of Shame (2014) - writer, director
 A Mooney for the Misbegotten (2014) - writer, director
 Dewey, Phukum & Howe (2015) - writer, director
 The Neighborhood (2015) - writer, director
 The Wreck (2015) - writer, director
 Calm the Light (2016) - writer, director
 A Room of My Own (2016) - writer, director
 The Wanderer (2018) - writer, producer

Published plays 

 Mercury: The Afterlife and Times of a Rock God - (2009) by Original Works Publishing.
 Three Plays by Charles Messina (Fugazy, Klepto and Merging) - (2011) by The Beckham Publications Group

Films 

 They're Just My Friends (2006) - co-writer
 Merging (2009) - screenwriter, director
 Spy (2011) - co-writer
 Choose (2011) - associate producer
 Thompson Street (2015) - writer

Books 

 My Father, My Don (2008) - co-author (published by The Beckham Publications Group) - Tony Nap Napoli

Podcasts 

 True East (series) (2015) - writer, director

References

External links 
 Charles Messina's official site
 NahNotOutsideMyHouse! Productions, Messina's production company
 

1971 births
Living people
21st-century American dramatists and playwrights
American writers of Italian descent
New York University alumni
Xavier High School (New York City) alumni